Iveria was a Georgian music ensemble founded in 1968 that gained popularity in the Soviet Union in the 1970s. The group's art director was Alexander Basilaia. The group sang both Georgian folk and contemporary songs, wrote and performed Argo and Jays Wedding musicals, and released 6 vinyl albums on Melodiya label.

Discography 
 Кругозор (Horizon), 1973
 13 лет (13 years old), 1982

References

External links 
 Unofficial site (in Russian)
 Discography (in Russian)
 

Musical groups established in 1968
Rock music groups from Georgia (country)
Pop music groups from Georgia (country)
Pop rock music groups from Georgia (country)
Folk rock groups from Georgia (country)
Soviet rock music groups